A boarder may be a person who:

snowboards
skateboards
bodyboards
surfs
stays at a boarding house
attends a boarding school
takes part in a boarding attack

The Boarder may also refer to:

The Boarder (1953 film), a 1953 Soviet drama film

See also
Board (disambiguation)
Border (disambiguation)
Bus boarder